Newport Station is a community in the Canadian province of Nova Scotia, located in the Municipal District of West Hants. The initial grant was given to John Nutting (loyalist).

References
Newport Station on Destination Nova Scotia

Communities in Hants County, Nova Scotia
General Service Areas in Nova Scotia